Gudisagar is a village in Dharwad district of Karnataka, India.

Demographics 
As of the 2011 Census of India there were 427 households in Gudisagar and a total population of 2,109 consisting of 1,067 males and 1,042 females. There were 264 children ages 0-6.

References

Villages in Dharwad district